Kampai II (Kampai 2nd, formerly) is a village in Kėdainiai district municipality, in Kaunas County, in central Lithuania. According to the 2011 census, the village had a population of 109 people.

History 
At the beginning of the 20th there were four okolicas of Kampai. From two of them - Kampai Kondratiniai and Kampai Tucevičiai - Kampai II village has been created at 1950s.

Demography

References

Villages in Kaunas County
Kėdainiai District Municipality